The 1938–39 season was the 30th year of football played by Dundee United, and covers the period from 1 July 1938 to 30 June 1939.

Match results
Dundee United played a total of 36 matches during the 1938–39 season.

Legend

All results are written with Dundee United's score first.
Own goals in italics

Second Division

Scottish Cup

References

Dundee United F.C. seasons
Dundee United